The 2001 Wellington Sevens, also known as the 2001 New Zealand Sevens, was an international rugby sevens tournament that was held in Wellington, New Zealand as the third leg of the 2000–01 World Sevens Series. The tournament took place at the Westpac Stadium on 9–10 February 2001.

The hosts, New Zealand, lost their first match of the season as they were defeated 19–17 by defending Wellington Sevens champions Fiji in the Cup quarterfinals. This was only the second time that a New Zealand sevens side had failed to reach the Cup final of World Sevens Series event. This was also the first event to hold a Shield competition which was won by Japan who defeated Papua New Guinea 27-19 in the final.

Australia became only the third nation to win a World Sevens Series title as they defeated Fiji 19–17 in the Cup final.

Format
The teams were drawn into four pools of four teams each. Each team played the other teams in their pool once, with 3 points awarded for a win, 2 points for a draw, and 1 point for a loss (no points awarded for a forfeit). The pool stage was played on the first day of the tournament. The top two teams from each pool advanced to the Cup/Plate brackets. The bottom two teams from each group went to the Bowl/Shield brackets.

Teams
The 16 participating teams for the tournament:

 
 
 
 
 
 
 
 
 
 
 
 
 
 
 
 

Niue was invited to replaced France after they withdrew from the tournament due to French clubs not releasing players.

Pool stage

Pool A

Source: World Rugby

Source: World Rugby

Pool B

Source: World Rugby

Source: World Rugby

Pool C

Source: World Rugby

Source: World Rugby

Pool D

Source: World Rugby

Source: World Rugby

Knockout stage

Shield

Source: World Rugby

Bowl

Source: World Rugby

Plate

Source: World Rugby

Cup

Source: World Rugby

Tournament placings

Source: Rugby7.com

Series standings
At the completion of Round 3:

Source: Rugby7.com

References

2000–01 IRB Sevens World Series
2001 in New Zealand rugby union
2001
February 2001 sports events in New Zealand